WEDway is a people mover system using linear induction motor (LIM) technology to propel vehicles along a pair of steel rails.

This system was developed by WED Enterprises (now Walt Disney Imagineering) and has been installed at places such as Walt Disney World Resort's Magic Kingdom (as Tomorrowland Transit Authority PeopleMover) and George Bush Intercontinental Airport (as Subway) in Houston, Texas, United States. 

The former PeopleMover, which operated at Disneyland from 1967 to 1995, did not use LIM, but instead used rubber wheels placed every 9 feet along the guide-way to move the cars.

The system was planned to be the main commuting method in the planned EPCOT city.

References

Disney technology
Linear induction motors